The Girls' discus throw at the 2017 World Youth Championships in Athletics was held on 12 and 14July.

Medalists

Records 
Prior to the competition, the following records were as follows.

Qualification 
Qualification rule: 48.00 m (Q) or at least 12 best (q) performers.

Final

References 

2017 IAAF World U18 Championships